The Creative Circus is a private for-profit college in Atlanta, Georgia. It was founded in 1995 and offers education in creative advertising, interactive development, design, and photography. The college plans to close in 2023.

History
 The Creative Circus was founded in 1995.
 In September, 2002 the school was acquired by the Delta Career Education Corporation.

Accreditation
The Creative Circus is accredited by the Council of Occupational Education.

References

External links
 Official website

Educational institutions established in 1995
1995 establishments in Georgia (U.S. state)
Universities and colleges accredited by the Council on Occupational Education